Pabra is a lake in Estonia.

Pabra may also refer to:
 Pabra, Haryana, a village in Haryana state of India